Aivis Švāns (born 2 May 1969) is a Latvian luger. He competed in the men's doubles event at the 1994 Winter Olympics. His sister is Evija Šulce.

References

External links
 
 
 

1969 births
Living people
Latvian male lugers
Olympic lugers of Latvia
Lugers at the 1994 Winter Olympics
People from Cēsis